Adama Fall (born 25 December 1950) is a Senegalese sprinter. He competed in the men's 100 metres at the 1976 Summer Olympics.

References

1950 births
Living people
Athletes (track and field) at the 1976 Summer Olympics
Senegalese male sprinters
Olympic athletes of Senegal
Place of birth missing (living people)